Jack Hively (September 5, 1910 – December 19, 1995) was an American film editor and film and television director whose career lasted from the 1930s through the 1980s. His father and his brother were also film editors.  He began as a film editor, before moving on to direct features. His career was interrupted by his enlistment in the U.S. Army following the Japanese bombing of Pearl Harbor in December 1941. After the war he returned to directing films, before moving on to directing on television.

Life and career
Hively was part of a theatrical family, his father, George Hively, was an Academy Award-nominated editor (for the 1935 film, The Informer), and his brother, George Hively Jr., was a film and television editor. His mother was  Georgenia Margaret Hively (née Steele).

Hively began his career in the film industry as an editor at RKO in 1933, working as an assistant editor on the Richard Dix film, No Marriage Ties. By the following year he was an editor, working on such films as Success at Any Price and Where Sinners Meet. Other notable films which Hively edited include: Annie Oakley (1935), starring Barbara Stanwyck; the 1936 comedy Smartest Girl in Town, starring Gene Raymond and Ann Sothern; The Man Who Found Himself (1937), which marked the starring debut for Joan Fontaine; Garson Kanin's 1938 comedy, Next Time I Marry, starring Lucille Ball, James Ellison, and Lee Bowman; and the second installment of The Saint franchise, 1939's The Saint Strikes Back, which marked the first time George Sanders appeared in the role. After his work on The Saint, Hively would be given the opportunity to direct his own films, beginning with 1939's They Made Her a Spy.

By 1940, he was considered by some to be one of the best directors in Hollywood. Between 1939 and the outbreak of World War II, Hively directed 14 features. Having edited the second film in The Saint franchise, Hively directed the next three as well, The Saint Takes Over and The Saint's Double Trouble in 1940, and in 1941 he directed the first feature film ever to be filmed in Palm Springs, California, The Saint in Palm Springs Other notable films which Hively directed during this time include: a sequel to Anne of Green Gables, Anne of Windy Poplars, starring Anne Shirley; the 1941 comedy starring Gloria Swanson and Adolphe Menjou, Father Takes a Wife; and the 1942 film noir, Street of Chance, starring Burgess Meredith and Claire Trevor.

In 1941, Hively began dating Dorothy Lovett.  The two had planned to marry on Christmas Day 1941, but Hively's enlistment in the Army Signal Corps caused those plans to be delayed. While training for the Army Signal Corps at Wright Field in Dayton, Ohio, Hively married actress Dorothy Lovett on March 17, 1942, St. Patrick's Day. Hively joined the Army Signal Corps in late 1941, and remained in the service for the duration of World War II, rising to the rank of Major. He served under General MacArthur in the Pacific Theater, along with screenwriter Jesse Lasky Jr. Prior to joining MacArthur's group in the Pacific, Hively was used to direct training films. While shooting one of those training films in Alaska, How to Operate in Cold Weather, Hively suffered what some accounts called "a very bad case of frostbite." After his discharge, Hively returned to the film industry, this time working for Universal Pictures, mostly as a second unit director.

By the end of the 1940s, Hively had left the film industry, and turned his attention to television. He worked sparingly during the 1950s, before becoming active once again in the 1960s and 1970s. He worked regularly on several television series, including Death Valley Days, Lassie, and The Life and Times of Grizzly Adams, as well as directing several TV movies. His final directorial credit was a television film entitled California Gold Rush.

Hively died on December 19, 1995, in Hollywood, California, and was buried in Forest Lawn Memorial Park in Glendale, California.

Filmography
(as per AFI's database)

References

External links
 

1910 births
1995 deaths
Burials at Forest Lawn Memorial Park (Glendale)
American film editors
Film directors from Texas
American documentary film directors